Chłaniów  is a village in the administrative district of Gmina Żółkiewka, within Krasnystaw County, Lublin Voivodeship, in eastern Poland.

On 23 July 1944, as revenge for the killing of an SS officer, the village of Chłaniów, together with nearby Władysławin, was burned down by the Ukrainian Self-Defense Legion. Overall, 44 residents died in the two villages. One of the officers ordering the attack was allegedly Michael Karkoc, who lived openly in Minnesota, USA until his death in 2019.

References

Villages in Krasnystaw County